The 2015 Canadian Championship (officially the Amway Canadian Championship for sponsorship reasons) was a soccer tournament hosted and organized by the Canadian Soccer Association. It was the eighth edition of the annual Canadian Championship, and took place in the cities of Edmonton, Montreal, Ottawa, Toronto and Vancouver in 2015. The participating teams were Ottawa Fury FC and FC Edmonton of the North American Soccer League, the second-level of the Canadian Soccer Pyramid, and Montreal Impact, Toronto FC and Vancouver Whitecaps FC of Major League Soccer, the first-level of Canadian club soccer. Montreal Impact were the two-time defending champions.

The winner, Vancouver Whitecaps FC, were awarded the Voyageurs Cup and will become Canada's entry into the Group Stage of the 2016–17 CONCACAF Champions League. This is a permanent change from procedure used in the past, where the Canadian Champion qualified for the CONCACAF Champions League beginning the same year (in this case, 2015–16).

The tournament moved to an April–August timeframe from its usual April–June timeframe to accommodate the schedule of the 2015 FIFA Women's World Cup held in Canada. It was permanently moved to a June/July timeframe in 2016.

Qualified teams

Bracket 

The three Major League Soccer and two NASL Canadian clubs are seeded according to their final position in 2014 league play, with both NASL clubs playing in the preliminary round, the winner of which advance to the semifinals.

All rounds of the competition are played via a two-leg home-and-away knock-out format. The higher seeded team has the option of deciding which leg it played at home. The team that scores the greater aggregate of goals in the two matches advances. Vancouver Whitecaps FC, was declared champion and earned the right to represent Canada in the 2016–17 CONCACAF Champions League.

Each series is a two-game aggregate goal series with the away goals rule.

Matches

Preliminary round 

FC Edmonton won 6–2 on aggregate.

Semifinals 

3–3 on aggregate. Montreal Impact won on away goals.

Vancouver won 3–2 on aggregate.

Final 

Vancouver won 4–2 on aggregate.

Goalscorers

References 

2015
2015 in Canadian soccer
2015 domestic association football cups